Amped is a remix/compilation album containing remixed tracks and new tracks. It is the third compilation album, second remix album, and first EP by the 116 Clique. It peaked at No. 24 on the Billboard Gospel albums chart.

Track listing 
 "Send Me/Represent"
 "Red Revolution"
 "Beyond Belief"
 "Cash or Christ/Fanatic"
 "No More"
 "Amped"

References 

116 (hip hop group) albums
2007 debut EPs
Reach Records albums